Breaking Up is a 1997 American romantic drama film directed by Robert Greenwald and written by Michael Cristofer, based on his stage play of the same name. The film stars Russell Crowe and Salma Hayek as a couple whose relationship leads to an out-of-the-blue marriage. It was released in the United States by Warner Bros. on October 17, 1997.

Cast
 Russell Crowe as Steve
 Salma Hayek as Monica
 Abraham Alvarez as the Minister

Reception  
Ken Eisner of Variety magazine wrote: "Russell Crowe and Salma Hayek make attractive leads, but they have neither the marquee power nor the requisite chemistry to keep "Breaking Up" from getting left at the altar of general distribution."

References

External links
 
 
 

1997 films
1997 romantic comedy films
1990s American films
1990s English-language films
American films based on plays
American romantic comedy films
Films directed by Robert Greenwald
Films scored by Mark Mothersbaugh
Films with screenplays by Michael Cristofer
Regency Enterprises films
Warner Bros. films